Zama City is a hamlet in northwestern Alberta, Canada within Mackenzie County.

The hamlet is located in Census Division No. 17 and in the federal riding of Grande Prairie—Mackenzie.

Demographics 

Economy 
It is based mainly around the oil and gas industry. A major oil pipeline connects Zama City with Norman Wells in the Northwest Territories.

Transportation 
Two airstrips serve the community, Zama Airport (CEX5) and Zama Lake Airport (CFT9).

See also 
List of communities in Alberta
List of designated places in Alberta
List of hamlets in Alberta

References

External links 
Hamlet of Zama City

Hamlets in Alberta
Designated places in Alberta
Mackenzie County